Yaverland Battery is a battery on the Isle of Wight, United Kingdom. It was constructed between 1861 and 1864.

It originally mounted eight 7-inch Armstrong Rifled Breech Loading (RBL) guns, and enclosed with a Carnot wall. A rear surrounding wall included a small barrack block for two officers and 57 men. By 1886 the original guns had been replaced by eight 64-Pounder Rifled Muzzle Loading guns. Between 1898 and 1900 the battery was re-modelled to mount three 6-inch Mk VII Breech Loading guns.

Between the First and Second World Wars the battery was used by Territorial Army artillery units for Coast Artillery gun practise.  In 1956 on the dissolution of Coast Artillery all of the guns were removed and the site sold off. It was developed for use as a holiday camp.

The remains of the Battery are now a Scheduled Ancient Monument.

References

Publications
 
 Col. K. W. Maurice-Jones (1959). The History of Coast Artillery in the British Army. London: Royal Artillery Institution.
 Moore, David, 2010. The East Wight Defences, Solent Papers Number 10, David Moore, Gosport.

External links
 Victorian Forts data sheet

Forts on the Isle of Wight
Artillery batteries